In enzymology, a 3-deoxy-manno-octulosonate cytidylyltransferase is an enzyme that catalyzes the chemical reaction

CTP + 3-deoxy-D-manno-octulosonate  diphosphate + CMP-3-deoxy-D-manno-octulosonate

Thus, the two substrates of this enzyme are CTP and 3-deoxy-D-manno-octulosonate, whereas its two products are diphosphate and CMP-3-deoxy-D-manno-octulosonate.

This enzyme belongs to the family of transferases, specifically those transferring phosphorus-containing nucleotide groups (nucleotidyltransferases).  The systematic name of this enzyme class is CTP:3-deoxy-D-manno-octulosonate cytidylyltransferase. Other names in common use include CMP-3-deoxy-D-manno-octulosonate pyrophosphorylase, 2-keto-3-deoxyoctonate cytidylyltransferase, 3-Deoxy-D-manno-octulosonate cytidylyltransferase, CMP-3-deoxy-D-manno-octulosonate synthetase, CMP-KDO synthetase, CTP:CMP-3-deoxy-D-manno-octulosonate cytidylyltransferase, and cytidine monophospho-3-deoxy-D-manno-octulosonate pyrophosphorylase.  This enzyme participates in lipopolysaccharide biosynthesis.

Structural studies

References

 

EC 2.7.7
Enzymes of known structure